The Y-12 National Security Complex is a United States Department of Energy National Nuclear Security Administration facility located in Oak Ridge, Tennessee, near the Oak Ridge National Laboratory. It was built as part of the Manhattan Project for the purpose of enriching uranium for the first atomic bombs. It is considered the birthplace of the atomic bomb. In the years after World War II, it has been operated as a manufacturing facility for nuclear weapons components and related defense purposes.

Y-12 is managed and operated under contract by Consolidated Nuclear Security, LLC (CNS), which is composed of member companies Bechtel National Inc., Leidos Inc., Orbital ATK, Inc, and SOC LLC, with Booz Allen Hamilton Inc. as a teaming subcontractor.  CNS also operates Pantex Plant in Texas.

History

Y-12 is the World War II code name for the  electromagnetic isotope separation plant producing enriched uranium at the Clinton Engineer Works in Oak Ridge, Tennessee, as part of the Manhattan Project. Construction began in February 1943 under the management of Stone and Webster.  Because of a wartime shortage of copper, the massive electromagnetic coils were made with 14,700 tons of coinage silver from U.S. government vaults at West Point. Colonel Kenneth D. Nichols met with the Under Secretary of the Treasury, Daniel W. Bell, and requested between five and ten thousand tons of silver. Bell's stunned reply was, "Colonel, in the Treasury we do not speak of tons of silver; our unit is the troy ounce." Thus the Manhattan Engineer District requested and was loaned 395 million troy ounces of silver (13,540 short tons, 12,300 tonnes) from the West Point Depository for the duration of the Manhattan Project. Special guards and accountants were assigned to the silver, and their responsible caretaking meant that at the end of the war, less than 0.036% out of more than $300 million worth of silver was lost to the process, with the remainder returned to the Treasury.

The Y-12 facility began operating in November 1943, separating uranium-235 from natural uranium, which is 99.3% uranium-238, by using calutrons to perform electromagnetic isotope separation. Y-12 separated the uranium-235 for Little Boy, the nuclear weapon that was dropped on Hiroshima, Japan on August 6, 1945. K-25, another facility in Oak Ridge, produced enriched uranium using gaseous diffusion. However, K-25 did not begin operating until March 1945 and fed slightly enriched uranium to Y-12's Beta Calutrons as the push to obtain enough uranium 235 for Little Boy came in the early summer of 1945. The S-50 Thermal Diffusion Plant at the K-25 site also provided feed material for Y-12's Beta Calutrons.

Tennessee Eastman was hired by the Army Corps of Engineers to manage Y-12 during the Manhattan Project. The company transferred scientists from Kingsport, Tennessee to Y-12 and operated the plant from 1943 to May 1947. The Y-12 electromagnetic plant units were initially operated by scientists from Berkeley to remove bugs and achieve a reasonable operating rate. They were then turned over to trained Tennessee Eastman operators who had only a high school education. Nichols compared unit production data, and pointed out to physicist Ernest Lawrence that the young "hillbilly" girl operators were outproducing his doctorate-holding scientists. They agreed to a production race and Lawrence lost, a morale boost for the Tennessee Eastman workers and supervisors. The girls were "trained like soldiers not to reason why", while "the scientists could not refrain from time-consuming investigation of the cause of even minor fluctuations of the dials". The young women that worked in this capacity came to be known as "Calutron Girls."

The Union Carbide corporation succeeded Tennessee Eastman as the operating contractor in 1947, remaining until 1984, when Union Carbide relinquished the contract for operating DOE's Oak Ridge facilities, and the Martin Marietta corporation (later Lockheed Martin) won the contract to take over the operation. BWXT Y-12 (name later changed to B&W Y-12) succeeded Lockheed Martin as the Y-12 operator in November 2000.

A chemical explosion injured several workers at the Y-12 facility on December 8, 1999, when NaK was cleaned up after an accidental spill, inappropriately treated with mineral oil, and inadvertently ignited when the surface coating of potassium superoxide was scratched by a metal tool.

1958 criticality incident
At 11 p.m. on June 16, 1958, a criticality accident occurred in the C-1 Wing of Building 9212 at the facility, then operating under the management of Union Carbide.  In the incident, a solution of highly enriched uranium was mistakenly diverted into a steel drum, causing a fission reaction of 15–20 minutes duration.  Eight workers were hospitalized for moderate to severe radiation sickness or exposure, but all eventually returned to work.  In June 1960 the eight workers, Bill Wilburn, O. C. Collins, Travis Rogers, R. D. Jones, Howard Wagner, T. W. Stinnett, Paul McCurry, and Bill Clark filed suit against the Atomic Energy Commission.  The suit was settled out-of-court.  Wilburn, who had received the highest radiation dose, was awarded $18,000 (approximately $185,000 in 2022 dollars).  Clark received $9,000 (worth approximately $92,500 in 2022).

Under the Energy Employees Occupational Illness Compensation Program, the eight later received additional compensation from the government; Clark collected multiple payments totaling about $250,000.  Most, if not all, of the eight victims were diagnosed with cancer at some point during their lives.  As of June 2014, Clark was the only surviving member of the eight.

2023 fire 
At 9 a.m. on February 22, 2023, a fire broke out in a uranium processing area of Building 9212. In a statement from the National Nuclear Security Administration, the fire was said to be contained later the same day.

Facilities and missions
Y-12's primary missions since the end of the Cold War have been to support defense needs through stockpile stewardship, assist on issues of nuclear non-proliferation, support the Naval Reactors program, and provide expertise to other federal agencies.  Y-12 is also responsible for the maintenance and production of all uranium parts and "secondary" mechanisms for every nuclear weapon in the United States arsenal.

Y-12 has a history of providing secure storage of nuclear material for both the United States and other governments. Early efforts focused on securing material from the former Soviet Union; recent activities have included recovery of highly enriched uranium from Chile.

Environmental cleanup has been an ongoing issue for the Department of Energy in Oak Ridge. The Y-12 plant was listed as an EPA Superfund site in the 1990s for groundwater and soil contamination. Today, the Y-12 plant is listed on the DOE's Cleanup Criteria/Decision Document Database (or C2D2 database).

An influx of funding from the American Recovery and Reinvestment Act benefited cleanup efforts by funding demolition and decontamination of aging facilities. These efforts work to further the long-term reduction in the size of the Y-12 facility.

CNS Y-12 currently employs approximately 4,700 people. About 1,500 additional personnel work onsite as employees of organizations that include UT-Battelle, Science Applications International Corporation, UCOR, and WSI Oak Ridge (an American-controlled unit of G4S Secure Solutions), which holds the security contract for the site. Workers at the site were represented by the Oil, Chemical and Atomic Workers International Union (OCAW).

Anti-nuclear protests

Since 1988, Oak Ridge Environmental Peace Alliance has organized non-violent direct action protests at the Y-12 Complex, in an effort to close down the weapons plant. Sister Mary Dennis Lentsch, a Catholic nun, has been arrested many times for protesting at the Oak Ridge facility. She has said, "I believe the continuing weapons production at the Y-12 National Security Complex in Oak Ridge, Tennessee, is in direct violation of the treaty obligations of the United States and consequently, is a violation of Article 6 of the U.S. Constitution".

In 2011, the Rev. William J. Bichsel, an 84-year-old priest, received a prison sentence of three months for trespassing on federal property at the Y-12 complex. In 2012, there have been protests about the proposed new Uranium Processing Facility, which is expected to cost $7.5 billion.

In July 2012, Megan Rice, an 82-year-old Catholic sister of the Society of the Holy Child Jesus, and two military veterans who now worked for peace, Gregory Boertje-Obed, and Michael Walli, entered the Y-12 complex. They were all Plowshares activists, and they chose Y-12 because of its crucial role in the production of nuclear weapons. They spray-painted anti-war slogans on the exterior of the Highly Enriched Uranium Materials Facility, a structure for storing weapons-grade uranium. The anti-nuclear activists, who got past fences and disabled security sensors before dawn on July 28, spent several hours in the complex, spray-painted peace messages, and prayed and sang before they were stopped by a guard, who was later joined by another. The security breach prompted private experts to criticize the Department of Energy's safeguarding of nuclear materials. The agency is to reappraise security measures across its nuclear weapons program. The DOE-OIG found that all of the defenses for the plant were insufficient and that the security response had "troubling displays of ineptitude." On May 9, 2013, the three were convicted of sabotage. In her testimony Rice said "I regret I didn't do this 70 years ago."

See also
 Anti-nuclear protests in the United States
 COLEX process (isotopic separation)
 Fogbank
 K-25
 Oak Ridge National Laboratory
 S-50
 Vulnerability of nuclear plants to attack

References

External links
 
 United States Department of Energy
 National Nuclear Security Administration
 A map of Oak Ridge, Tennessee during the time of the Manhattan Project

Nuclear weapons infrastructure of the United States
United States Department of Energy facilities
Buildings and structures in Anderson County, Tennessee
Industrial buildings and structures in Tennessee
Isotope separation facilities
Oak Ridge, Tennessee
Manhattan Project sites
Isotope separation facilities of the Manhattan Project
Military history of Tennessee
Military research of the United States
1943 establishments in Tennessee
Anti-nuclear protests in the United States
Nuclear accidents and incidents in the United States
Superfund sites in Tennessee